The Kota Kinabalu District is an administrative district in the Malaysian state of Sabah, part of the West Coast Division which includes the districts of Kota Belud, Kota Kinabalu, Papar, Penampang, Putatan, Ranau and Tuaran. The capital of the district is in Kota Kinabalu City.

Demographics 

According to the 2010 census, the population of the district was 462,963. The main ethnic groups were the Chinese (20%), Kadazan-Dusun (15%), Bajaus (16%), Malays (8%) and Muruts (6%). As in most other parts of Sabah, there was also a significant number of illegal immigrants from the southern Philippines - mainly from the Sulu Archipelago and Mindanao - many of whom are not included in the population statistics.

Gallery

See also 
 Districts of Malaysia

References

Further reading

External links 

  Kota Kinabalu City Hall